Wandsworth LBC v D'Silva [1998] IRLR 193 is a UK labour law case, concerning mutual trust and confidence and the limit of power of employers to vary work conditions.

Facts
Mr D'Silva claimed that Wandsworth LBC breached their employment contracts by attempting to unilaterally vary the Code of Practice on Staff Sickness, which came from a collective agreement with Unison. D'Silva's contract stated in paragraph 4: ‘[F]rom time to time variations in your terms and conditions of employment will occur, and these will be separately notified to you or otherwise incorporated in the documents to which you have reference.’ The council sought to reduce the period of sick leave from 12 to 6 months before an assessment of an employee for termination or redeployment would be made. The council argued the Code was not ‘apt’ to be incorporated.

Judgment
The Court of Appeal held that the Code was not apt for incorporation, but if it had been, Lord Woolf MR said the following:

See also

UK labour law

Notes

References
E McGaughey, A Casebook on Labour Law (2019) 239-240

United Kingdom labour case law